Wu Faxian (1915–2004) was a Chinese Communist revolutionary and lieutenant general of the People's Liberation Army. In 1930 he became a soldier of Chinese Red Army, two years later he joined the Chinese Communist Party. He participated in five Counter-Encirclement Campaigns, Long March, Battle of Pingxingguan, Liaoshen Campaign and Pingjin Campaign.

In 1955 he was granted the military rank of lieutenant general. Wu was a subordinate of Lin Biao, in 1965 he became the commander of People's Liberation Army Air Force. After Lin's failed coup, he was imprisoned as part of the post-Lin purges. In 1973, he was stripped of all titles and Party membership. In 1981 he was declared guilty as a member of the Lin Biao group and sentenced to 17 years in prison. However, due to good behavior and his past meritious service, as well as ailing health, he was released later the same year when he was given a house, car and a monthly pension as his party membership and titles were restored. He was given a state funeral when he died in 2004 which was attended by many former subordinates as well as representatives from the PLA.

References

1915 births
2004 deaths
People of the Cultural Revolution
People from Ji'an
People's Liberation Army generals convicted of crimes
Members of the 9th Politburo of the Chinese Communist Party
Commanders of the People's Liberation Army Air Force
People's Liberation Army generals from Jiangxi